The Prater Liliputbahn is a  gauge light railway in Vienna, Austria. Opened in 1928, and extended in 1933, the railway operates primarily as a tourist attraction, but also provides transport links around the wider area of the Prater park, the amusement park (Wurstelprater), and the sports stadium. Although a year-round service was provided for many years, it is now more common for the railway to close during the months of December, January, and February. Originally steam-operated, the railway now uses a mixture of steam and diesel motive power. The railway can be reached by bus, tram, or metro from central Vienna, followed by a short walk, but following the extension of tram line 1, there is now an almost direct interchange with the Vienna tram network at the railway's Rotunda Station.

The railway is named after the fictional island Lilliput (German: Lilliput and Liliput), inhabited by very small individuals in Gulliver's Travels (German: Gullivers Reisen) by Jonathan Swift.

History
Opened on 1 May 1928, the line runs for almost  around the Prater park, an extensive public recreation area in the Austrian capital. A celebration of the centenary of the death of composer Franz Schubert occasioned the original construction of the railway. A design of  gauge locomotive was drawn up in 1923 by Chief Engineer Martens of the Munich-based Krauss and Company engineering company, based on a German  4-6-2 design, and 20 of these locomotives were built between 1925 and 1950. Three from the second batch were ordered for the Prater Liliputbahn, and two were delivered, and are still operating there today; the order for the third engine was cancelled. The railway was extended in 1933, almost doubling its length. The full running line of 3.95 kilometres is marked throughout at 100-metre intervals with white-painted stone mileposts.

Stations

Although there is no 'true' terminus station, as both ends of the line feature return balloon loops, Prater Hauptbahnhof and Rotunde were originally built to serve the two ends of the original (shorter) railway. When the line was extended to the Ernst-Happel sports stadium in 1933 a new 'terminus' was constructed. The newest station opened in 2011 (see below), in conjunction with local business interests. The mainline is double track throughout, allowing multiple trains to operate in both directions simultaneously.

Prater Hauptbahnhof
Situated within the Prater amusement park, this station (English: Prater Central Station) is the headquarters of the railway. Facilities include a large staff room, a ticket office, facilities for coaling and watering steam locomotives, and (nearby) the main railway depot comprising a three-road steam shed, and a large carriage shed which doubles as a home for the diesel locomotives. There are two platforms, both on the 'outside' of the balloon loop, and effectively forming two stations (sometimes referred to as Prater Arrival and Prater Departure). For most of its history the railway has required passengers to alight at one platform, and board at the other, as a means of passenger control. However, this practice has been gradually phased out in the early years of the twenty-first century, and had ended by 2011. The former 'arrival' platform is now largely disused, but still in place and maintained for use at special events.

Schweizerhaus Luftburg
This new station was opened in March 2011 in time for the new 'season' of the Prater park. The station's unusual name (English: Swiss House - Air Castle) is the result of naming it after two nearby businesses, in conjunction with which the station has been built. Schweizerhaus and Luftburg are restaurants, both located just outside the Prater amusement park, on the way into the public park. The station has only one platform, as trains only stop in the eastbound direction (coming out of the Prater park). Westbound trains slow down, but do not stop, and a fence separates them from the station platform.

Rotunde
Once the easterly limit of the railway, this station (English: Rotunda Station) has been an intermediate station since 1933. It features two platforms and an attractive station building with ticket office. Having survived its reduction in status, and a subsequent falling off of passenger numbers, Rotunde experienced a significant increase in traffic following the completion of a tram line operating from Vienna city centre to the Rotunda. Trams terminate at a tram stop (with balloon loop) less than a minute's walk from Rotunda Station, giving the Prater Liliputbahn a direct connection onto the Vienna public transport system.

Ernst-Happel-Stadion
The line ends in woodland, west of the Ernst Happel sports stadium. The station (English: Stadium Station) has a single platform located on the entrance to the balloon loop, and is provided with a ticket office. Immediately after leaving the station, trains turn sharply into the loop, running through mature trees, until the line has fully looped back onto itself, for the return journey.

Locomotives

Steam engines
The two original 4-6-2 'Pacific' steam locomotives are still in operation, numbered 1 and 2. They are used in summer high-season operations. Three such engines were ordered from Krauss & Company, but the third was cancelled before delivery, due to initially poor passenger numbers. This third locomotive had, however, already been built. The builders, Krauss, who had sent the first three locomotives of this class to a Munich transport exhibition in 1925, and subsequently on tour (with positive sales results) now used the 'spare' locomotive for similar tours of engineering exhibitions. Its eventual fate is unknown. However, after the 1933 lengthening of the line, traffic increased, and eventually a third locomotive was again required. It was ordered from Krauss, who were still constructing the same class of locomotive as Nos. 1 and 2 (construction continued until 1950) and entered service as No. 3 in 1942. This third locomotive was subsequently withdrawn and scrapped, its wheels and frames being used to construct a diesel locomotive, still in service as locomotive D2. The original boiler of No 3 is still on static display in the Prater park.

Diesel engines
During the bulk of the year the railway is operated by its four diesel locomotives, numbered D1 to D4. Locomotive D4 underwent an extensive rebuild and renewal in 2009, following several years out of service. Although none of the locomotives carry nameplates, and the official website makes no mention of locomotive names, the English translation website of the railway company does assign names to each of the locomotives currently in service. The diesel engines provide year-round service, even when the steam engines are in use, as the high season operation of the line requires three locomotives off-peak, and four locomotives at peak times.

Hydrogen engine
In 2018 an experimental locomotive was moved to the railway, powered by electricity, with generation through a hydrogen fuel cell in a tender. The locomotive is intended to demonstrate the capabilities of hydrogen power for the wider rail industry, and has been developed by a consortium consisting of ÖBB Infra (a division of the Austrian Federal Railways), Liliputbahn/TEMO, Air Liquide, Railway Competence and Certification GmbH, and Prosoft Süd Consulting GmbH. The locomotive has been named Hydro-Lilly.

Summary of motive power

Environmental upgrade
Following extensive conversations with local authorities and environmental groups, the Prater Liliputbahn has become a world pioneer in the use of environmentally friendly miniature railway locomotion. A refurbishment programme commenced in 2008, with the diesel locomotives converted (in numerical order, starting with engine D1) to burning recycled vegetable oil. The effect is carbon-neutral operation. Locomotive D4 was harder to convert, owing to its engine type, but by 2010 all diesel locomotives had been converted. These engines are now powered by vegetable oil recycled from the restaurants of the Prater amusement park.

The locomotive Hydro-Lilly (see above) is a further stage in the railway's development of environmentally-friendly traction.

Rolling stock
An extensive stock of passenger coaches is sufficient to operate four passenger trains simultaneously. There is also a limited stock of wagons, used for maintenance purposes. The standard passenger carriage has 16 seats, in four compartments, of four seats each, two facing the direction of travel, and two with backs to the direction of travel. Each standard coach will therefore accommodate sixteen adults, or a larger number of children. A small number of coaches have received alteration so as to be able to accommodate wheel chairs. One coach has a non-standard seating pattern, with bench type seats around the four sides of a central table in one half of the carriage, and standard compartments in the other half. There are no specialist vehicles for luggage or guards, but a compartment is reserved for the train guard on each train.

The current passenger coaches, although rebuilt and repaired with time, still operate on the original frames. In normal operation each train consists of a set of six carriages. There are twenty-four principal carriages, made up into four train sets, and currently each individual set is painted in a particular livery, including two that advertise local businesses. Passenger coaches and goods wagons are maintained on site by the railway's staff.

See also 
 Fifteen-inch gauge railway

References

External links

 mostly in German, but with a limited English-language section.

Buildings and structures in Leopoldstadt
15 in gauge railways in Austria
Transport in Vienna
Tourist attractions in Vienna
Railway lines opened in 1928